River Where the Moon Rises is a 2021 South Korean television series starring Kim So-hyun, Na In-woo, Lee Ji-hoon and Choi Yu-hwa. Based on the 2010 novel Princess Pyeonggang by film director and screenwriter Choi Sagyu, it aired on KBS2 from February 15 to April 20, 2021, every Monday and Tuesday at 21:30 (KST). The series is available on Viu with multi-language subtitles. The series was submitted for the 2021 International Emmy Awards.

Originally cast as On Dal, Ji Soo was replaced after allegations of bullying and sexual abuse sparked a scandal. Six episodes had already aired; the remaining 14 were reshot with new lead Na In-woo. On March 24, 2021, it was reported that there was a plan to re-film the first six episodes of the show as well, since the original versions with Kim Ji Soo had been taken down. The decision was also influenced by the positive reception to Na In-woo's acting and chemistry with female lead Kim So-hyun despite the circumstances of his casting. Both Kim and Na was nominated in the 57th Baeksang Arts Awards for their performance in the drama, with Kim being the youngest nominee for the Best Actress—Television category in the award's history.

Synopsis
The series retells the love story between Princess Pyeonggang and On Dal, characters from a classic Goguryeo folktale.

Princess Pyeonggang (Kim So-hyun) was born as a princess but raised as an assassin. Upon learning the truth of her origins, she fights to win back her country and rightful throne from the corruption that has taken over.

A peace-loving man, On Dal (Na In-woo) is the exact opposite of the warrior princess. But as the two fall for each other, On Dal finds himself forsaking his principles in order to keep her safe. An endeavor that proves increasingly difficult, as players from all sides converge in a lethal battle for the throne.

Cast

Main
 Kim So-hyun as Princess Pyeonggang / Yeom Ga-jin 
 Heo Jung-eun as young Princess Pyeonggang
 Jung Yoon-ha as baby Princess Pyeonggang 
A princess determined to be first Queen regnant of Goguryeo and restore the country her father failed.

Na In-woo as On Dal
Seo Dong-hyun as young On Dal
A peace-loving, pure man who goes against his principles in order to protect Princess Pyeonggang.
 Lee Ji-hoon as General Go Geon
Park Min-sang as young Go Geon
An elite general who is perfect in every way and longs to make Pyeonggang his.

 Choi Yu-hwa as Hae Mo-yong
 Moon So-hee as young Hae Mo-yong
A woman who desired to take control of Goguryeo and play with it as she wants. She is the adoptive daughter of Hae Ji-wol and falls in love with Go Geon.

Supporting

Royal Palace
 Kim Pub-lae as King Pyeongwon, was originally a benevolent and generous king, but he has gradually changed into a sensitive and suspicious personality. Since then, he has been playing around with Gowon Pyo's tactics and is keeping the palace his.
 Cha Kwang-soo as Jin Pil, father of the second queen Jin-bi and a timid and weak person who depends on his daughter's power.
 Kim Jung-young as Lady Gongson, nanny of Princess Pyeonggang. She is a loyal person who is guarding the empty Gongju Palace (Magnolia Palace) alone, hoping that Princess Pyeonggang, who disappeared 10 years ago will return alive, and then becomes a shadow of Pyeonggang after Pyeonggang comes back alive.
 Kim So-hyun as Queen Yeon, the former Queen of Goguryeo. A brave and intelligent woman, she works to protect Goguryeo from evil tribe leaders but is killed by Go Won-pyo at Sunnobo. She is the mother of Princess Pyeonggang and Prince Go-won.
 Son Woo-hyuk as Head Eunuch, he is a close aide to the King Pyeongwon and the head of eunuchs.
 Ahn Shin-woo as Kim Pyeong-ji, a friend of King Pyeongwon and a servant of Goguryeo. He is a person who does not check his family because he does not have much to see, has no property, and even has no family to protect
 Wang Bit-na as Queen Jin, a figure who won the king's heart with her outstanding beauty and manner. She is the mother of Prince Geon-mu, she seeks the chance to drive out Prince Go-won and make Prince Geon-Mu the king.
 Ki Eun-se as Royal Consort Hyeon, one of King Pyeongwon's concubines.
 Kwon Hwa-woon as Prince Go-won, Princess Pyeonggang's younger brother and the person who encourages On Dal to participate in the war.
Park Sang-hoon as young Prince Go-won.

Ghost village (Sunnobu Tribe)
 Kang Ha-neul as General On Hyeop, the father of On Dal and the head of the Sunno region in Goguryeo. His is a dutiful leader who fulfills his responsibilities for his country and his people. Embodying a sense of charisma and righteousness, he is a revered general of the people who receives support and loyalty from the masses.
 Hwang Young-hee as Lady Sa, the nanny of On Dal. She took care of On Dal after his father's wrongful death and the only remaining family of On Dal.
 Jung Wook as Sa Woon-am, a subordinate general of On Dal's father, General On Hyeop and leader of Sunno tribe after General's death.
 Kim Dong-young as Sa Pung-gae, the son of commander Sa Woon-am and On Dal's childhood friend.
 Kim Hyun-bin as young Sa Pung-gae
 Oh Ah-rin as Wol-yi, a Baekje refugee and playful child who uplifts everyone in the Ghost village.
Yoon Ah-jeong as Hong Mae, a maiden that lives in Sunno.
 Lee Sang-chan as Seok Gu. Ran from working at Goon-yeong's barn because the work was too hard, is found by On Dal and is taken to the ghost village, he looks gruff but is very deep-minded and loyal.
 Won Woo as Pil Gu. Ran from the construction site of the Jangan Castle, goes from mountain to mountain and meets On Dal and ends up in the ghost village.

Gyeru Tribe
 Lee Hae-young as Go Won-pyo, the Gochuga of Gyeru Tribe, a cunning and elaborate politician who boasts a brilliant speech and excellent showmanship. With the conviction that his family should become King of Goguryeo, he takes the lead to dethrone the reign of King Pyeongwon.
 Yoon Joo-man as Go Sang-cheol, Go Won-pyo's right-hand man.

Sonobu Tribe
 Jung In-gyeom as Hae Ji-wol, head of Sono tribe and one of the most powerful people in Goguryeo.

Jeolnobu Tribe
 Jasper Cho as Wol Gwang, a monk and former Jeolnobu's greatest fighter who once defended the north.

Cheonjubang
 Han Jae-young as Du Jung-seo, an expert in witchcraft and the imperial fortune-teller who predicts good and bad fortune of Goguryeo.
 Ryu Ui-hyun as Tarasan, a talkative but clumsy best friend of Princess Pyeonggang and Tarajin's twin brother.
 Kim Hee-jung as Tarajin, a killer who lives with her twin brother Tarasan, in Dorim-hyang, where people abandoned in Goguryeo gather.
 Moon Jin-seung as Ma Tae-mo, a member of the Cheonjubang a group in which Pyeong-gang belongs. He is a cruel murderer without compassion, and is loyal to Du Jung-seo.
 Jung Eun-pyo as Yeom Deuk, adoptive father of Yeom Ga-jin.

Silla Kingdom
 Kim Bum-suk as Kim Cha-seung
 Kim Seung-soo as Jinheung of Silla

Extended
 Jung Dong-geun as Il-yeong, Go Geon's escort warrior.
 Jo Bok-rae

Production

Development
Early working title of the series is Pyeong-gang, Cut to the Heart.

The series is based on Choi Sagyu's novel Princess Pyeonggang. The novel shows a different perspective on Princess Pyeonggang as an outstanding leader to her country and people, breaking the image of a crying princess and a pleasant-looking wife in the Goguryeo folktale Pyeonggang and Ondal. Choi took 25 years to complete the novel. It is directed by Yoon Sangho, who directed other works such as Saimdang, Memoir of Colors, Different Dreams, Kingmaker: The Change of Destiny and written by Han Ji-hoon, who previously wrote Time Between Dog and Wolf, Temptation and Woman of 9.9 Billion. The drama is produced by Victory Contents. Kim Soung-eun, owner of jewelry brand  Naschenka, designed the jewelry featured in the drama including the gold, peony blossom-shaped crown wore by Princess Pyeonggang.

On January 27, 2021, Viu revealed River Where the Moon Rises as its latest Viu Original. Virginia Lim, Viu's chief content officer commented: "With an exceptional script and amazing talent, River Where the Moon Rises is not to be missed."

Casting
The production company Victory Contents conducted a public audition for the drama from August 3–4 to be produced in the second half of 2020. The performers recruiting are male and female actors from 1987 to 2005, skilled in martial arts and sports or have experience in dramas, movies, and performances. On October 30, Victory Contents announced the winner of The Next public audition, actor Jung Dong-geun. He was chosen through 1:1000 candidates.

On August 25, Sports Seoul reported that Son Ye-jin was in talks to star in the series. Following the reports, a source from Son's agency MS Team Entertainment shared, "It's one of the projects she has received offers for, and nothing is decided yet." They continued, "She is currently spurring her advance into Hollywood by affirming her appearance in the Hollywood film The Cross by Andrew Niccol." The same day, it was also reported that Kang Ha-neul was cast as On Dal, but turned down the offer due to a scheduling conflict on September 21. The following day, Kang's agency confirmed his special appearance as General On Hyeop.

On October 5, it was reported that Kim So-hyun had been cast and confirmed as the drama's protagonist. On October 13, it was reported that Ji Soo had received an offer for the role of Ondal, the male protagonist in the drama but was still reviewing it. On October 22, Ji Soo was confirmed to be acting as the male lead On Dal, with Lee Ji-hoon and Choi Yu-hwa joining the cast. The script reading was held on October 23, 2020.

The series reunited actors Kim So-hyun, Ji Soo and Hwang Young-hee who previously acted together in the drama Page Turner. It marked the fourth collaboration of Kim So-Hyun with Hwang Young-hee after 2016 series Page Turner, film Pure Love and 2017 series While You Were Sleeping, and second collaboration with Jung Eun-pyo in 2012 Moon Embracing the Sun. It also reunited Kim So-Hyun and Kim Hee-jung who previously worked together in the 2015 series Who Are You: School 2015.

Filming
On November 23, the production of River Where the Moon Rises was suspended as a direct result of the COVID-19 pandemic. It was reported that a supporting actor was identified as close contact with a COVID-19 carrier. Ten crew members who came in contact with the person also underwent voluntary COVID-19 testing. OCN's The Uncanny Counter, which shares the set with the series, decided to cancel their press conference. On November 24, the extra's result was confirmed positive, but all affiliated cast and crew members tested negative. For safety, the production crew practiced self-isolation for one or two more days, observed the situation, and resumed shooting.

After the series ended, Lee Ji-hoon revealed he injured his nose during an action scene, suffering difficulty breathing. He underwent nose surgery on June 29 to treat his deviated septum.

Release
KBS showed a 40-second pre-release special video at the 2020 KBS Drama Awards on December 31, 2020. A special video part 2 was released on January 8, 2021. A poster released on January 14 features the silhouette of Pyeonggang on a horse with On Dal's face faintly hovering in the sky above her. This reflects Pyeonggang's strong determination to restore and lead Goguryeo and On Dal's love for Pyeonggang and his desire to watch over her. It reads, "On Dal, the general who turned love into history. Princess Pyeonggang, whose life in Goguryeo was everything." The series aired after Royal Secret Agent from February 15, 2021.

Original soundtrack

River Where the Moon Rises Original Television Soundtrack
The following is the official track list of River Where the Moon Rises Original Television Soundtrack album. The tracks with no indicated lyricists and composers are the drama's musical score; the artists indicated for these tracks are the tracks' composers themselves. The album consisting of a total of 22 tracks released digitally on April 13, and physically on April 20.

Part 1

Part 2

Part 3

Part 4

Part 5

Part 6

Episodes

Reception

Critical response
Lee Do-hak, an expert on Korean history and a professor at the Korea University of Traditional Culture described the series as "it is not a story but real history" as the drama shifts from 'The Story of Pyeonggang' to 'The Story of Ondal' [...] with the message that Ondal consistently emphasizes in his story is 'keeping promises'." He also said the drama "shows the genres of various historical dramas centered on one person named Pyeonggang, where the reality and dreams of current youth are projected. It depicts the aspects of war and political historical dramas reflecting the characteristics of the times of Goguryeo, while at the same time portraying the growing drama of Peace and Ondal, as well as the youth melodrama. These various fun elements are the reason why 'River of the Rising Moon' has gained a wide audience of various generations." Despite Na In-woo sudden appearance on the drama, Professor Lee praised him for "adjust[ing] the awkwardness through filming" and Kim So-hyun for her great effort in "growing him as an actor by matching the newly-introduced Na In-woo, just as Pyeonggang grew Ondal in the drama". historical drama with an amazing story that has never been seen before. He concluded by saying that "The River Where the Moon Rises is a historical drama with an amazing story that has never been seen before.

Viewership

Awards and nominations

Controversies

Backlash from Chinese netizens about Hanbok origin
On February 13, 2021, Kim So-hyun was heavily criticized by Chinese internet users regarding Kim Instagram's photo of herself taken at a drama set wearing a Hanbok, in which she wished her followers, "Everyone, have a safe and warm Happy Lunar New Year". The post was flooded with claims that the Korean traditional costume she was wearing was a Chinese traditional costume known as Hanfu, with several Chinese netizens calling South Korea a "thief country". Afterwards, Rapper E Sens and singer Song Ga-in expressed their anger at the so-called 'hanbok remarks'. E Sens wrote a direct remark about the issue on his Instagram story, and Song posted a picture of herself wearing a Hanbok with the caption "Kimchi and Hanbok are our country's, please!". Using the hashtags, 'love kimchi' and 'love hanbok'.

Ji Soo involved in school violence allegations
On March 3, 2021, school violence rumours surrounding actor Ji Soo circulated online. Through a handwritten letter, Ji Soo admitted to the school bullying rumours and apologized to those who have been hurt by his past actions and those involved in the production of the currently ongoing drama. However, he denied committing the alleged sexual assaults among these allegations, which also including extorting the students of their money, fighting and proxy testing. Ji Soo was one of the many people from the entertainment industry who were accused of being a school bully in their school days since February 2021, in which the list of people also included Park Hye-su, Jo Byeong-kyu, (G)I-dle's Soojin and Shim Eun-woo, who either denied the allegations or apologised to the victims.

The following day, a KBS representative shared that filming scheduled for March 4 was cancelled due to Ji Soo's ongoing school violence controversy. On March 5, Ji Soo was removed as a cast member from the drama. Later that day, it was confirmed that Ji Soo was replaced by Na In-woo from episode 7 onwards.  The production had completed filming 90% of the drama when the allegations first arose. On March 24, a plan was proposed by the production team to re-film the first six episodes of the show (which included Ji Soo) in light of Na In-woo's replacement of the actor and the expressed public interest by existing viewers to rewatch the first six episodes and new viewers to watch the previous episodes, as well as the positive reception to Na's acting and chemistry with female lead Kim So-hyun despite the circumstances of his casting. The production team also promised to release the first six re-filmed episodes through the online broadcasting platforms and VODs as soon as possible. In a post-drama interview, Lee Ji-hoon said that it took him around 3 days to complete the reshoots with Na In-woo while Kim So-hyun, who had the most scenes with the male lead, underwent one more month of filming to complete the re-shoots.

Cast members Lee Ji-hoon, Wang Bit-na, Kim Hee-jung and Yoon Joo-man offered to participate in the re-shoots without payment. It was later revealed two months after the drama end, Kim So-hyun also participated in the re-shoots without payment out of love and affection for the drama and her character.

On April 2, 2021, the show's production company is currently pending a lawsuit against Ji Soo and his management agency KeyEast regarding the damages caused to the drama, which totalled up to around 3 billion won as a result of the bullying scandal caused by Ji Soo. They stated that they earlier tried to seek compensation from KeyEast but to no avail due to the non-cooperation of the agency.

Notes

References

External links
  
 River Where the Moon Rises at Daum 
 
 

Korean-language television shows
Korean Broadcasting System television dramas
2021 South Korean television series debuts
South Korean historical television series
Television series set in Goguryeo
Television shows based on South Korean novels
Television productions suspended due to the COVID-19 pandemic
Television series by Victory Contents
2021 South Korean television series endings
Korean-language Viu (streaming media) exclusive international distribution programming